Benjamín Manuel Enzema Owono (born 25 March 1989 in Akoga) is an Equatoguinean athlete. In the 1500 m event at the 2009 World Championships in Berlin, he set a personal best time of 4:13.17. At the 2012 IAAF World Indoor Championships in Istanbul, Enzema set a new national record time in the 800 m with a 1:58.19. Three months later at the 2012 African Championships in Porto-Novo, Benin, he shaved a further 1.9 seconds off the record, lowering it to 1:56.29.

He competed in the 800 m event at the 2012 Summer Olympics but was eliminated in the first round.

At the 2020 Summer Olympics, he competed in the men's 1500m event.

Personal bests
800m - 1:51.54 (Cergy-Pontoise, France) 20 June 2017
1500m - 3:46.14 (Kortrijk, Belgium) 14 July 2018
3000m - 8:24.48 (Angoulême, France) 1 June 2018
5000m - 14:18.46 (Blois, France) 23 June 2018
Marathon - 2:23:28 (Annecy, France) 14 Apr 2019

References

External links
 
 
 
 

1989 births
Living people
People from Evinayong
Olympic athletes of Equatorial Guinea
Equatoguinean male middle-distance runners
Athletes (track and field) at the 2012 Summer Olympics
Athletes (track and field) at the 2016 Summer Olympics
World Athletics Championships athletes for Equatorial Guinea
Athletes (track and field) at the 2020 Summer Olympics